The following is a list of current National Hockey League franchise owners.

All of the NHL's teams use some form of holding company for the team's assets, sometimes through multiple layers of corporations, which are all listed in the "Operating Entities" column. The "Principal Owner(s)" column lists the majority or plurality owner(s) of the team or, in the case of teams held by publicly held corporations, the corporation's chairman.

Each team has a representative on the NHL Board of Governors, the league's ruling and governing body, listed in the "NHL Governor" column; for most teams, this is the majority or plurality owner of the club.

† Only one of the owners can be that team's NHL Governor.
‡ Child/family member of the team's owner.

1 David S. Blitzer, minority owner of the New Jersey Devils, represent the team on the board.
2 Dave Scott, CEO of Comcast Spectacor, represents the Philadelphia Flyers.
3 President and CEO of the Pittsburgh Penguins, David Morehouse, represents the team instead of one of its owners.

See also
NHL Enterprises, LP
 List of professional sports team owners
 List of NFL franchise owners
 List of NBA team owners
 List of Major League Baseball principal owners
 List of MLS team owners

References

External links
 The Business Of Hockey List - Forbes

 
Owners